Athletes from East Germany (German Democratic Republic) competed at the 1976 Summer Olympics in Montreal, Quebec, Canada. 267 competitors, 154 men and 113 women, took part in 139 events in 17 sports.

Medalists

Athletics

Men's Marathon
 Waldemar Cierpinski — 2:09.55 (→  Gold Medal)

Men's 4 × 100 m Relay 
 Manfred Kokot, Jörg Pfeifer, Klaus-Dieter Kurrat, and Alexander Thieme
 Heat — 39.42
 Semi Final — 39.43
 Final — 38.66s (→  Silver Medal)

Men's High Jump
 Rolf Beilschmidt
 Qualification — 2.16m
 Final — 2.18m (→ 7th place)
 Henry Lauterbach
 Qualification — 2.13m (→ did not advance)

Men's Long Jump
 Frank Wartenberg
 Qualification — 7.89m
 Final — 8.02m (→  Bronze Medal)

Men's Discus Throw
 Wolfgang Schmidt
 Qualification — 63.14m
 Final — 66.22m (→  Silver Medal)
 Norbert Thiede
 Qualification — 61.14m
 Final — 64.30m (→ 4th place)
 Siegfried Pachale
 Qualification — 60.64m
 Final — 64.24m (→ 5th place)

Men's 20 km Race Walk
 Hans-Georg Reimann — 1:25:13 (→  Silver Medal)
 Peter Frenkel — 1:25:29 (→  Bronze Medal)
 Karl-Heinz Stadtmüller — 1:26:50 (→ 4th place)

Women's Shot Put
Marianne Adam
Final — 20.55 m (→ 4th place)
Ilona Slupianek
Final — 20.54 m (→ 5th place)
Margitta Droese
Final — 19.79 m (→ 6th place)

Boxing

Men's Light Flyweight (– 48 kg)
 Dietmar Geilich
 First Round — Bye
 Second Round — Lost to Armando Guevara (VEN), 0:5

Canoeing

Cycling

Eleven cyclists represented East Germany in 1976.

Individual road race
 Karl-Dietrich Diers — 4:49:01 (→ 16th place) 
 Gerhard Lauke — did not finish (→ no ranking)
 Hans-Joachim Hartnick — did not finish (→ no ranking)
 Siegbert Schmeisser — did not finish (→ no ranking)

Team time trial
 Hans-Joachim Hartnick
 Karl-Dietrich Diers
 Gerhard Lauke
 Michael Schiffner

Sprint
 Jürgen Geschke —  Bronze Medal

1000m time trial
 Klaus-Jürgen Grünke — 1:05.927 (→  Gold Medal)

Individual pursuit
 Thomas Huschke —  Bronze Medal

Team pursuit
 Norbert Dürpisch
 Thomas Huschke
 Uwe Unterwalder
 Matthias Wiegand

Diving

Fencing

One male fencer represented East Germany in 1976.

Men's foil
 Klaus Haertter

Football

 Gold Medal
 First Round
Drew with  0-0
Defeated  1-0
Quarterfinals
Defeated  4-0
Semifinals
Defeated  2-1
Final
Defeated  3-1
Team roster
Jürgen Croy
Hans-Ulrich Grapenthin
Gerd Weber
Gert Heidler
Hans-Jürgen Dörner
Konrad Weise
Lothar Kurbjuweit
Reinhard Lauck
Reinhard Häfner
Hans-Jürgen Riediger
Bernd Bransch
Martin Hoffmann
Gerd Kische
Dieter Riedel
Wolfram Löwe
Hartmut Schade
Wilfried Gröbner 
Head coach: Georg Buschner

Gymnastics

Handball

Judo

Rowing

East Germany had 30 male and 24 female rowers participate in all fourteen rowing events in 1976. Each team received a medal.

 Men's single sculls – 3rd place ( bronze medal)
 Joachim Dreifke

 Men's double sculls – 3rd place ( bronze medal)
 Uli Schmied
 Jürgen Bertow

 Men's coxless pair – 1st place ( gold medal)
 Jörg Landvoigt
 Bernd Landvoigt

 Men's coxed pair – 1st place ( gold medal)
 Harald Jährling
 Friedrich-Wilhelm Ulrich
 Georg Spohr

 Men's quadruple sculls – 1st place ( gold medal)
 Wolfgang Güldenpfennig
 Rüdiger Reiche
 Karl-Heinz Bußert
 Michael Wolfgramm

 Men's coxless four – 1st place ( gold medal)
 Siegfried Brietzke
 Andreas Decker
 Stefan Semmler
 Wolfgang Mager

 Men's coxed four – 2nd place ( silver medal)
 Andreas Schulz
 Rüdiger Kunze
 Walter Dießner
 Ullrich Dießner
 Johannes Thomas

 Men's eight – 1st place ( gold medal)
 Bernd Baumgart
 Gottfried Döhn
 Werner Klatt
 Hans-Joachim Lück
 Dieter Wendisch
 Roland Kostulski
 Ulrich Karnatz
 Karl-Heinz Prudöhl
 Karl-Heinz Danielowski

 Women's single sculls – 1st place ( gold medal)
 Christine Scheiblich

 Women's double sculls – 2nd place ( silver medal)
 Sabine Jahn
 Petra Boesler

 Women's coxless pair – 2nd place ( silver medal)
 Angelika Noack
 Sabine Dähne

 Women's coxed four – 1st place ( gold medal)
 Karin Metze
 Bianka Schwede
 Gabriele Lohs
 Andrea Kurth
 Sabine Heß

 Women's quadruple sculls – 1st place ( gold medal)
 Anke Borchmann
 Jutta Lau
 Viola Poley
 Roswietha Zobelt
 Liane Weigelt

 Women's eight – 1st place ( gold medal)
 Viola Goretzki
 Christiane Knetsch
 Ilona Richter
 Brigitte Ahrenholz
 Monika Kallies
 Henrietta Ebert
 Helma Lehmann
 Irina Müller
 Marina Wilke

Sailing

Shooting

Swimming

Men's Competition
100 meter Backstroke
Roland Matthes — 57.22 —  Bronze Medal

Women's Competition
100 meter Freestyle
Kornelia Ender — 55.65 —  Gold Medal
Petra Priemer — 56.49 —  Silver Medal
200 meter Freestyle
Kornelia Ender — 1:59.26 —  Gold Medal
400 meter Freestyle
Petra Thumer — 4:09.89 —  Gold Medal
800 meter Freestyle
Petra Thumer — 8:37.14 —  Gold Medal
100 meter Backstroke
Ulrike Richter — 1:01.83 —  Gold Medal
Birgit Treiber — 1:03.41 —  Silver Medal
200 meter Backstroke
Ulrike Richter — 2:13.43 —  Gold Medal
Birgit Treiber — 2:14.97 —  Silver Medal
100 meter Breaststroke
Hannelore Anke — 1:11.16 —  Gold Medal
100 meter Butterfly
Kornelia Ender — 1:00.13 —  Gold Medal
Andrea Pollack — 1:00.98 —  Silver Medal
200 meter Butterfly
Andrea Pollack — 2:11.41 —  Gold Medal
Ulrike Tauber — 2:12.50 —  Silver Medal
Rosemarie Gabriel — 2:12.86—  Bronze Medal
400 meter Individual Medley
Ulrike Tauber — 4:42.77 —  Gold Medal
4x100 meter Freestyle Relay
Petra Priemer; Kornelia Ender; Claudia Hempel; Andrea Pollack — 3:45.50 —  Silver Medal
4x100 meter Medley Relay
Ulrike Richter; Hannelore Anke; Kornelia Ender; Andrea Pollack — 4:07.95 —  Gold Medal

Volleyball

Women's team competition
Preliminary round (group B)
 Lost to Cuba (1–3)
 Lost to South Korea (2–3)
 Lost to Soviet Union (2–3)
Classification Matches
 5th/8th place: Defeated Peru (3–2)
 5th/6th place: Lost to Cuba (0–3) → Sixth place
Team roster
Karla Roffeis
Johanna Strotzer
Cornelia Rickert
Christina Walther
Ingrid Mierzwiak
Helga Offen
Barbara Czekalla
Jutta Balster
Anke Westendorf
Hannelor Meincke
Monika Meissner
Gudrun Gartner
Head coach: Dieter Grund

Weightlifting

Wrestling

References

Germany, East
1976
Summer Olympics
1976 in German sport